NGC 3504 is a barred spiral galaxy in the constellation Leo Minor. It is a member of the NGC 3504 Group of galaxies, which is a member of the Leo II Groups, a series of galaxies and galaxy clusters strung out from the right edge of the Virgo Supercluster.

There is a large amount of molecular gas centered on the galactic nucleus. Compared with other barred spiral galaxies, NGC 3504 is in an early phase of its evolution.

The mass of NGC 3504 has been difficult to narrow down, but it is believed to be between 2.5*109 M⊙ and 9*109 M⊙.

References

External links
 
 

Leo Minor
Barred spiral galaxies
3504
033371